Yokosawa (written: 横澤) is a Japanese surname. Notable people with the surname include:

, Japanese actress and comedian
, Japanese judoka

Japanese-language surnames